Coleophora seguiella is a moth of the family Coleophoridae. It is found in Algeria.

References

seguiella
Endemic fauna of Algeria
Moths described in 1915
Moths of Africa